Ashley Mizuki Robbins, or Ashley Mizuki Robins in PAL regions, is the lead character from Cing's Another Code: Two Memories (released in North America as Trace Memory) and its direct sequel Another Code: R - A Journey Into Lost Memories. Within the series, Ashley is a Japanese American teenage girl from Seattle who is estranged from her father and haunted by the murder of her mother. Outside of the series, the character has appeared in the Super Smash Bros. fighting game series.

The character has been praised by video game journalists as a relatable female lead character in video games, although critical reception over the portrayal and depiction of the character in the video game series have been mixed.

Development 
Ashley was designed by Taisuke Kanasaki, the director and character designer for the first Another Code game. Visually, Ashley is presented as a tomboy with somewhat androgynous features. Kanasaki wanted Ashley to be relatable to both male and female players: she is intended to have the personality of a girl her own age instead of relying on typical age or gender markers that video games tend to use for character archetypes. Ashley was originally intended to be 17 years old, but her age was later changed to 14 by Rika Suzuki, the game's scenario writer, to appeal to a wider range of age groups. As part of the developers' efforts to broaden Ashley's appeal, her "ghost sidekick" in the first game is given the design of a young boy.

Ashley's character was slightly altered in the English localisation by Ann Lin of Nintendo of America's Product Development Department in order to make her more "realistic" and less "accepting" than her Japanese counterpart. In Lin's opinion, "a believable person would have certain feelings of betrayal, not just acceptance. I wanted to explore that just a little. I think the [Japanese text] was a little more accepting, not really questioning the weirdness of meeting a ghost or any of the [strange] circumstances that had befallen her". The developers were concerned about the way they should present an older Ashley in Another Code: R - A Journey into Lost Memories. While they already had an idea in mind for her in the first game, they decided to write her with a more mature personality. One of the developer's daughters assisted in the development process by playing out a scene where Ashley has a long conversation with her father to get her opinion on how well they achieved the distance between a girl of her age and an "out-of-touch" father.

In a 2012 interview, Suzuki credited the Another Code series for generating interest in the adventure game genre within the Japanese video game industry. She suggested that Ashley's appeal is a large part of this reception,  noting that with the character, "there is no gender or age classification, it's just you and the story". Suzuku also confirmed that Hotel Dusk: Room 215 and the Another Code series share the same universe, and said that she would have liked to see an older version of Kyle Hyde, the protagonist of Hotel Dusk, meet an older Ashley.

Appearances 
The story of the first Another Code game takes place the day before Ashley's 14th birthday. Her father Richard Robbins, whom she believed to be dead, sends her an invitation out of the blue to meet him on "Blood Edward Island"; the island is named because the family who once owned the island and lived there, the "Edwards", were all rumored to have met a bloody end. After arriving on the island, Ashley's attempts to reunite with her father lead her into journey to uncover the truth behind her family and her mother Sayoko Robbins' murder, while also uncovering the truth behind a mysterious project code-named "Another". In the process, Ashley meets and befriends a ghost with amnesia who cannot remember his life or how he died, and only recalls the single letter "D". Ashley and "D" agree to help each other uncover their own answers on Blood Edward Island.

In Another Code: R, Ashley is in her latter teenage years and has become an aspiring musician. Despite reuniting with her father in the prior game, the two have drifted apart again and their relationship has become estranged. After not seeing her father for nearly six months, Ashley suddenly receives an invitation from him to go on a camping trip at a resort called "Lake Juliet". Ashley reluctantly goes on the trip, only to be thrown into a day full of more investigations when she starts experiencing strange sporadic "flashbacks" when she arrives. Along the way she encounters and forms a strong unlikely friendship with a young boy, Matthew Crusoe (who she calls "Matt"), who is trying to locate his missing father while running away from his uncle. Ashley attempts to uncover the truth behind both mysteries and the mysteries surrounding Matt, while keeping Matt out of the hands of the local authority, who will drag Matt back to his uncle's if caught.

Outside of the series, she has appeared in Super Smash Bros. Brawl  as a trophy and collectible sticker, achievable after 100 hours of gameplay. The character has appeared in Super Smash Bros. Ultimate as a "support spirit".

Reception 
The portrayal of Ashley's experiences with her father in Another Code: R has been  generally well received. Anthony John Agnello from The A.V. Club described her interactions with a grippingly realistic, dull portrayal of "daddy issues". In a preview of Another Code, IGN editor Craig Harris praised the dialogue, stating that it was written with an emphasis on giving Ashley a unique personality. 1UP.com editor Jeremy Parish stated that anyone who has been gaming for a while and has experience with adventure games will appreciate Ashley, adding that she was likely an attempt by Nintendo to appeal to teenage girls.

Ashley's usage of an in-universe multipurpose problem solving tool, similar in appearance and function to a Nintendo DS device, has received a mixed response: it was praised from Hardcore Gamer and The Norman Transcript for its novelty but also met with criticism from Nintendo World Report. Doug Skiles from Hardcore Gaming 101 observed that there was a concerted effort to give more dialogue to Ashley in the North American release Trace Memory, and that her characterization is "a little more skeptical, a little more opinionated" in terms of personality compared to the European and Japanese version.

Ashley's depiction in Another Code: R drew a generally mixed response.  The Telegraph editor Chris Schilling described her as older and braver in the sequel, but retains her "endearing fragility." Adventure Gamers's review described her as inquisitive but also vulnerable like a realistic teenager. Another Adventure Gamers editor Kim Wild stated that while she has matured since Another Code, citing her learning the guitar and starting a band, as well as becoming more logical, she still demonstrates a "childlike frustration" for her father. Freelance journalist Chris Scullion praised the character as an example of a "rare, well-rounded female lead" in video games. Agnello lauded the subtle approach utilized in the progression of Ashley's character arc and her investigation of the mysteries surrounding her. Skiles found Ashley's personality to be more sarcastic in the sequel, with "a far more interesting variety of actions and reactions" as she is fully animated. He lauded the game's writing for the convincing portrayal of Ashley's growth in between games and called it one of its highlights. Conversely, Oli Welsh from Eurogamer felt that while the focus on a confused teenage girl is a welcome change, the game's slow pace fails to make her narrative journey compelling. This iteration of the character has been noted by the 2010 publication EZ Guides: The Games of the Decade to be more "tailored for the female demographic", citing story elements like the use of conventionally attractive male characters befriended by Ashley, her personal desire to be a musician, and the game's portrayal of her issues with her father, as being gender orientated aspects and a shift in tone from "Agatha Cristie and more One Tree Hill. Mark Clapham expressed disappointment at Ashley's story arc within Another Code: R, noting that the character was "never really threatened" and criticized the realism behind her approach to problem solving.

Analysis 
Ashley's Robbins was used in a study into the effects of narrative presentation format on sixth-graders' comprehension of and motivation for reading, by professors at the Teachers College, Columbia University. The first Another Code game, released in North America as Trace Memory, was picked as Ashley's young age made her an appropriate proxy for the study subjects. Subjects were given a comprehension assessment designed by the authors to measure both literal understanding of the story as well as higher-order comprehension of Ashley's character. Eleven literal comprehension questions were presented in relation to Ashley's character motivations, story relative, and her relationships with other characters. Her relationship with her aunt Jessica Robbins was a particular point of focus.

References 

Adventure game characters
Female characters in video games
Fictional American people in video games
Fictional characters from Seattle
Fictional Eurasian people
Fictional Japanese American people
Fictional paranormal investigators
Musician characters in video games
Nintendo protagonists
Orphan characters in video games
Teenage characters in video games
Video game characters introduced in 2005